Lewis James Pullman (born January 29, 1993) is an American actor. His film credits include The Strangers: Prey at Night, Bad Times at the El Royale (both 2018), and Top Gun: Maverick (2022). On television, he starred as Major Major Major Major in Catch-22 and Rhett Abbott in Outer Range. His upcoming projects include the lead role in the film adaptation of Stephen King's 'Salem's Lot.

Life and career 
Lewis James Pullman was born on January 29, 1993, in Los Angeles, California. He is the son of actor Bill Pullman and modern dancer Tamara Hurwitz. He has a sister, Maesa, who is a singer-songwriter, and a brother, Jack, who is a puppet-maker. His mother is of Norwegian and Jewish descent.

Pullman plays the drums in the band Atta Boy alongside Eden Brolin, Freddy Reish, and Dashel Thompson. They released their first album, Out of Sorts, in 2012 as a "whimsical experiment." Their second album, Big Heart Manners, was released in 2020 after an eight-year hiatus.

Pullman began his acting career with several short films, starting with The Tutor in 2013. He had to split his time between living in Los Angeles and Montana. He said he was "on the tractor division [in college]. I figured if acting didn't work out I could be on the road crew, working the back hoe." In 2015, he graduated from Warren Wilson College in Swannanoa, North Carolina, with a bachelor's degree in Social Work. That same year, he was asked by filmmakers Jonathan Dayton and Valerie Faris to audition for Highston, a television series from Sacha Baron Cohen and Amazon Studios. In September 2015, his casting was confirmed and the series was given a six-episode order. The series starred Pullman in the lead role as a 19-year-old whose imaginary friends were real-life celebrities. The pilot episode, guest-starring Flea and Shaquille O'Neal, was well received by critics. In December 2017, however, Highston was canceled after only one episode.

Pullman made his feature film acting debut in 2017 with The Ballad of Lefty Brown, a Western starring his father in the titular lead role. His additional roles in 2017 include the Arnold Schwarzenegger-led Aftermath, the British drama Lean on Pete, and the critically acclaimed film Battle of the Sexes, the latter also starring his father.

In 2018, Pullman had a leading role in the slasher film The Strangers: Prey at Night. Though the film received mixed reviews when compared to its predecessor, it was a box-office success, grossing $32.1 million against a $5 million production budget. That same year, he starred alongside Jeff Bridges, Cynthia Erivo, Dakota Johnson, Jon Hamm, Cailee Spaeny, and Chris Hemsworth in Bad Times at the El Royale. On casting Pullman, writer and director Drew Goddard said "it was one of those good old-fashioned casting searches. After meeting with lots and lots and lots of actors, Lewis came in and you just felt that immediately. The last time that happened, quite honestly, was when Chris Hemsworth walked in for The Cabin in the Woods. You're just looking for actors who inherently fit the role — and then also transcend the role. Lewis had that sort of magic." Upon release, the film received generally positive reviews from critics, and his performance was also singled out, with Den of Geek calling it a "standout" and The Seattle Times writing that he "shines as the troubled desk clerk, who serves as the film's (very) late-arriving moral conscience."

In 2019, Pullman had a recurring role as Major Major Major Major in Catch-22, the Hulu adaptation of the 1961 novel of the same name starring George Clooney. That same year, he starred in the thriller film Them That Follow. In 2022, Pullman played Rhett Abbott in the Amazon series Outer Range, Lieutenant Robert "Bob" Floyd in the Tom Cruise-led sequel Top Gun: Maverick, and the romantic lead in Press Play. He will next star in the James Wan-produced horror film Salem's Lot, an adaptation of the 1975 novel of the same name by Stephen King; The Hollywood Reporter writes that the role "promises to be a breakthrough and career-making for Pullman."

In August 2022, it was revealed Pullman would star alongside Brie Larson in the Apple TV+ series Lessons in Chemistry.

Filmography

Film

Television

References

External links
 

1993 births
Living people
21st-century American male actors
American male film actors
American male television actors
Male actors from Los Angeles
Warren Wilson College alumni